Torfaen is a unitary authority in South East Wales. Torfaen includes 16 communities.

Communities in Torfaen

See also

 Torfaen County Borough Council
 List of communities in Wales

References
All population figures are from the United Kingdom Census 2011, provided by the Office for National Statistics from their Neighbourhood Statistics website www.neighbourhood.statistics.gov.uk. To see the records for a community, enter the name of the community, and select Parish as the type of area. From the topics displayed, select Census, then 2011 Census:Key Statistics, then Key Figures for 2011 Census: Key Statistics.

External links
 Torfaen County Borough website
 Office for National Statistics website